The 42nd Tony Awards ceremony was held on June 5, 1988, at the Minskoff Theatre and broadcast live on CBS, hosted by Angela Lansbury.

The Ceremony
Musicals represented were:
 A Chorus Line, "Music and the Mirror" - Donna McKechnie
 Anything Goes, "Anything Goes" - Patti LuPone and Company
 Dreamgirls, "One Night Only"/"Dreamgirls" - Sheryl Lee Ralph, Loretta Devine and Terry Burrell;
 Into the Woods, "Into the Woods"/"Children Will Listen" - Phylicia Rashad and Company;
 The Phantom of the Opera, Last verse of "The Phantom of the Opera" and "The Music of The Night" - Sarah Brightman and Michael Crawford;
 Romance/Romance, "I'll Always Remember the Song"/"It's Not Too Late" - Scott Bakula, Alison Fraser and Company
 Sarafina!, "Sarafina!" - Company

Plays represented were:M. Butterfly, Scene with John Lithgow and BD Wong;
Joe Turner's Come and Gone, Scene with Mel Winkler, Ed Hall and Delroy Lindo;
A Walk in the Woods, Scene with Sam Waterston and Robert Prosky; and
Speed-the-Plow, Scene with Joe Mantegna and Ron Silver.

A tribute to the late Michael Bennett was performed by Donna McKechnie of the original Chorus Line and the three original Dreamgirls, Terry Burrell, Loretta Devine and Sheryl Lee Ralph.

At these Tony Awards, the longest-running musical on Broadway, Andrew Lloyd Webber's Phantom of the Opera, competed for awards and received the season's Best Musical award.

Winners and nominees
Winners are in bold

Special awards
Regional Theatre Tony Award
 South Coast Repertory, Costa Mesa, CA

Special Awards
 Brooklyn Academy of Music

Multiple nominations and awards

These productions had multiple nominations:

10 nominations: Anything Goes, Into the Woods and The Phantom of the Opera 
7 nominations: M. Butterfly 
6 nominations: Joe Turner's Come and Gone 
5 nominations: Romance/Romance and Sarafina!  
4 nominations: Cabaret  
3 nominations: Breaking the Code, Speed-the-Plow and A Streetcar Named Desire
2 nominations: Burn This, Chess and A Walk in the Woods 

The following productions received multiple awards.

7 wins: The Phantom of the Opera 
3 wins: Anything Goes, Into the Woods and M. Butterfly

See also
 Drama Desk Awards
 1988 Laurence Olivier Awards – equivalent awards for West End theatre productions
 Obie Award
 New York Drama Critics' Circle
 Theatre World Award
 Lucille Lortel Awards

References

External links
 Tony Awards Official Site

Tony Awards ceremonies
1988 in theatre
1988 theatre awards
Tony
1988 in New York City